Dysstroma suspectata is a species of geometrid moth in the family Geometridae. It is found in North America.

The MONA or Hodges number for Dysstroma suspectata is 7185.

Subspecies
These two subspecies belong to the species Dysstroma suspectata:
 Dysstroma suspectata mackieata Cassino & Swett, 1923
 Dysstroma suspectata suspectata (Möschler, 1874)

References

Further reading

 
 

Hydriomenini
Articles created by Qbugbot
Moths described in 1874